The Royal Television Society (RTS) is a British-based educational charity for the discussion, and analysis of television in all its forms, past, present, and future. It is the oldest television society in the world. It currently has fourteen regional and national centres in the UK, as well as a branch in the Republic of Ireland.

History
The group was formed as the Television Society on 7 September 1927, a time when television was still in its experimental stage. Regular high-definition (then defined as at least 200 lines) broadcasts did not even begin for another nine years until the BBC began its transmissions from Alexandra Palace in 1936.

In addition to serving as a forum for scientists and engineers, the society published regular newsletters charting the development of the new medium. These documents now form important historical records of the early history of television broadcasting.

The society was granted its Royal title in 1966.  The Prince of Wales became patron of the Society in November 1997.

Activities
The society regularly holds meetings and seminars, attended by members of the public and professionals from various areas of the television industry, and it also publishes the monthly magazine Television, covering a broad range of television topics.

Major events held by the RTS include the biennial RTS Cambridge Convention, a three-day event held at King's College, Cambridge. The convention, chaired by one of the UK's major broadcasters, brings together influential figures from the television industry for a series of stimulating talks.

The RTS also hosts "Anatomy of a Hit" events, which gather together the writers, cast and commissioner of some of Britain's most successful TV shows to discuss their qualities. Recent programmes discussed have included Sherlock, Doctor Who, and Humans.

The society also holds a substantial archive of printed, photographic, and audio-visual material of value to television historians and scholars.

Awards
The Royal Television Society hosts six national award ceremonies annually:

National Awards

RTS Programme Awards
RTS Craft & Design Awards
RTS Television Journalism Awards
RTS Student Television Awards
RTS Young Technologist Awards is given to this seen as potential future leaders in broadcasting technology.
RTS Pilgrim Awards acknowledges the outstanding work of RTS volunteers.

Regional Awards

The Royal Television Society hosts fifteen regional award ceremonies annually:

RTS Cymru/Wales Awards
RTS Devon and Cornwall Awards
RTS East Awards
RTS Isle of Man Awards
RTS London Awards
RTS Midlands Awards
RTS North East and Border Awards
RTS North West Awards
RTS Northern Ireland Awards 
RTS Republic of Ireland Awards 
RTS Scotland Awards
RTS Southern Awards
RTS Thames Valley Awards
RTS West of England Awards (formerly known as RTS Bristol Awards)
RTS Yorkshire Awards

RTS Futures
RTS Futures was launched in 2007 to help people in the early stages of their television careers. RTS Futures offers the opportunity to meet with senior industry professionals, such as series producers and commissioners, as well as their peers in the television industry.
RTS Futures hosts a wide range of talks and training sessions aimed at helping young people progress in the business. Recent events have included How to be the Best Researcher and the RTS Futures Entry Level Training Fair.

Presidents of the Society

Lord Haldane of Cloan PC (1927–1928)
Sir Ambrose Fleming FRS (1928–1945)
Sir Robert Renwick Bt KBE (1945–1954)
Sir Vincent Ferranti MC (1954–1957)
Sir George Barnes (1958–1960)
Sir Harold Bishop CBE (1961–1962)
Sir Robert Fraser OBE (1963–1964)
Sir Neil Sutherland CBE MA FIEE (1965–1966)
Lord Bowden (1967–1972)
Aubrey Buxton MC (Lord Buxton MC DL) (1973–1977)
Duke of Kent GCMG GCVO ADC (1977–1979)
Sir Huw Wheldon OBE MC (1979–1986)
Sir Paul Fox CBE (1986–1992)
Bill Cotton CBE (1992–1995)
Michael Grade (1995–1997)
Sir Jeremy Isaacs (1997–2000)
Will Wyatt CBE (2000–2004)
Sir Robert Phillis (2004–2009)
Sir Peter Bazalgette (2010–2016)
Vacancy

References

External links
Royal Television Society
Royal Television Society Futures

1927 establishments in the United Kingdom
British television awards
Educational charities based in the United Kingdom
Organisations based in the City of London
Organizations established in 1927
Television organisations in the United Kingdom